The 1965 Rhode Island Rams football team was an American football team that represented the University of Rhode Island as a member of the Yankee Conference during the 1965 NCAA College Division football season. In its third season under head coach Jack Zilly, the team compiled a 2–7 record (1–4 against conference opponents), finished in fifth place out of six teams in the Yankee Conference, and was outscored by a total of 181 to 52. The team played its home games at Meade Stadium in Kingston, Rhode Island.

Schedule

References

Rhode Island
Rhode Island Rams football seasons
Rhode Island Rams football